Don Edwards San Francisco Bay National Wildlife Refuge (DESFBNWR) is a United States National Wildlife Refuge located in the southern part of San Francisco Bay, California. The Refuge headquarters and visitor center is located in the Baylands district of Fremont, next to Coyote Hills Regional Park, in Alameda County.  The visitor center is on Marshlands Rd, off Thornton Ave.

Most of the refuge stretches along the marshy shoreline north and south of the Dumbarton Bridge, but Bair Island, in San Mateo County, is also part of the system. The southernmost extent of the refuge is in northern Santa Clara County.

History
It was founded in 1974 as the first urban National Wildlife Refuge established in the United States, and it is dedicated to preserving and enhancing wildlife habitat, protecting migratory birds, protecting threatened and endangered species, and providing opportunities for wildlife-oriented recreation and nature study for the surrounding communities.

As of 2004, the Refuge spanned  of open bay, salt pond, salt marsh, mudflat, upland and vernal pool habitats located throughout south San Francisco Bay. About  of salt ponds within the refuge are managed by Cargill Salt, which has perpetual salt-making rights. Cargill uses the salt ponds to concentrate brines as part of its solar salt operation which produces salt for food, agriculture, medical, and industrial uses throughout the Western United States.

Located along the Pacific Flyway, the Refuge hosts over 280 species of birds each year. The variety of birds that may call the refuge home or use it as a stopover include white pelicans, white-tailed kites, hawks, ospreys, and eagles. Millions of shorebirds and waterfowl stop to refuel at the Refuge during the spring and fall migration. In addition to its seasonal visitors, the Refuge provides critical habitat to resident species like the endangered California clapper rail and salt marsh harvest mouse. Today, hundreds of thousands of people visit the Refuge each year to enjoy its diverse wildlife and habitats.

The Don Edwards San Francisco Bay National Wildlife Refuge is one of six wildlife refuges in the San Francisco Bay Area. The others are: Antioch Dunes, Ellicott Slough, Farallon, Marin Islands, and San Pablo Bay. It was renamed Don Edwards San Francisco Bay National Wildlife Refuge in 1995 in recognition of Congressman Don Edwards and his efforts to protect sensitive wetlands in south San Francisco Bay.

Gallery

See also

Bair Island
Mowry Slough
Greco Island
Newby Island landfill
Coyote Hills Regional Park

References

External links

Large collection of photos and trail descriptions of Don Edwards Wildlife Refuge 
Don Edwards San Francisco Bay National Wildlife Refuge – US Fish and Wildlife Service official site.
Don Edwards San Francisco Bay National Wildlife Refuge: Final Comprehensive Conservation Plan US Fish and Wildlife Service
San Francisco Bay National Wildlife Refuge Complex
South Bay Salt Pond Restoration Project
Cargill Salt – San Francisco Bay
From Salt Ponds to Wetlands, Quest, KQED-TV.
YouTube footage

 
Wetlands of California
Wetlands of the San Francisco Bay Area
National Wildlife Refuges in California
Protected areas of Alameda County, California
Protected areas of San Mateo County, California
Protected areas of Santa Clara County, California
Protected areas established in 1974
San Francisco Bay
Tourist attractions in Fremont, California
Landforms of Alameda County, California
Landforms of San Mateo County, California
Landforms of Santa Clara County, California
San Francisco Bay Trail